A Fluidized Bed Scrubber system uses carefully selected hollow plastic elements of varying shapes, according to the process requirements, to generate a three phase fluidized bed in which increased Reynolds numbers (turbulence) in the gaseous phase, and the liquid phase, provoke an intense enhancement of turbulent action.  This is claimed to lead to substantial increases in overall mass and heat transfer coefficients, and interphase surface renewal rates, as compared to classical packings and other scrubbing technologies (see below).

Particulate removal
In addition, the fluid bed simultaneously removes particulates down to very fine sub half micron diameters. System design varies from application to application as process operations, or pollution control needs, vary widely.

Quenching
When very hot gases are to be treated and cleaned using the fluidized bed scrubber technology, they are first passed through a quench chamber, which is usually integrated with the scrubber such that quenching can occur in two steps, using both the inlet quench section and a specially designed sump to maximum effect. The cooled gases are then passed on directly to the fluidized bed where ascending gas is intimately mixed by the fluidized packing elements with the descending, and usually recirculated, liquid.

Applications
The fluidized bed scrubber system allows operation with slurries, muds and oily or viscous liquids due to the claimed 100% non-clogging  nature of the fluidized bed.

Comparisons
Below are two real case comparisons of equivalent efficiency alternative technologies commonly used in industrial applications.

Venturi and packed tower combination versus TURBOSCRUBBER

A typical packed tower absorber versus Fluidized Bed Scrubbers

Images

References

Scrubbers
Pollution control technologies
Industrial processes
Fluidization